The 1972 National Invitation Tournament was the 1972 edition of the annual NCAA college basketball competition.

Selected teams
Below is a list of the 16 teams selected for the tournament.

 Davidson
 Fordham
 Indiana
 Jacksonville
 Lafayette
 Maryland
 Memphis
 Missouri
 Niagara
 Oral Roberts
 Princeton
 Saint Joseph's
 St. John's
 Syracuse
 UTEP
 Virginia

Bracket
Below is the tournament bracket.

See also
 1972 NCAA University Division basketball tournament
 1972 NCAA College Division basketball tournament
 1972 NAIA Division I men's basketball tournament
 1972 National Women's Invitational Tournament

References

National Invitation
National Invitation Tournament
1970s in Manhattan
Basketball in New York City
College sports in New York City
Madison Square Garden
National Invitation Tournament
National Invitation Tournament
Sports competitions in New York City
Sports in Manhattan